This is a list of women's football clubs in Brazil, for men's football clubs, see the list of football clubs in Brazil.

See also
 List of football clubs in Brazil

References
 Brazil Women's League 2007 at RSSSF
 2007 Copa do Brasil de Futebol Feminino at CBF

External links
 LINAF (Liga Nacional de Futebol)

 
Brazil women
Women's football clubs